Valto is a Finnish name originated as a variation of the Scandinavian name Valdemar. As of mid-2012, more than 2300 people living in Finland have the name Valto.

Notable people
 Valto Olenius, a Finnish pole vaulter
 Valto Karhumäki, a Finnish aviation pioneer

References

Finnish masculine given names